David J. Buller (born September 12, 1959) is an American philosopher of science who is Distinguished Research Professor and Chair Emeritus of the Department of Philosophy at Northern Illinois University. He is known for his 2005 book Adapting Minds, in which he presents a detailed philosophical critique of evolutionary psychology.

References

Further reading

External links
Faculty page

1959 births
Living people
21st-century American philosophers
20th-century American philosophers
Northern Illinois University faculty
Northwestern University alumni
Philosophers of science